Bendon may refer to:

 Bendon, Michigan
 Bendon Publishing International

People with the surname Bendon
 Dan Bendon (born 1989), English cricketer
 James Bendon (born 1937), British philatelist

See also 
 Brendon (disambiguation)